Andrew Alfons Engman (November 21, 1911 – July 16, 2004) was a Swedish/Finnish cartoon animator. Engman worked for Walt Disney Studios in Burbank, California, from the animating of Snow White and the Seven Dwarfs (1937 film) to the completion of The Jungle Book (1967 film), about 1937 to 1971. He started out as an "In-Betweener" animator. He did some Donald Duck and Goofy cartoons as a character animator, and went on to being a special effects animator. Later he went into production in a middle management position. He also worked on the effect animations of Make Mine Music (1946) and the layout of Der Fuehrer's Face (1943).

Early life 

Andrew Alfons Engman was born on November 21, 1911, in Vaasa, Finland. Andy claims he could see Russian soldiers going through his yard when he was a child during World War One in the 1910s.

Works 

Visual Effects:

 The Brave Engineer (1950) (effects animator)
 Make Mine Music (1946) (effects animator)
 How to Be a Sailor (1944) (animator)
 The Olympic Champ (1942) (animator) (uncredited)
 How to Play Baseball (1942) (animator)
 Donald's Gold Mine (1942) (animator)
 Donald's Snow Fight (1942) (effects animator) (uncredited)
 The Art of Self Defense (1941) (animator)
 The Art of Skiing (1941) (animator)
 The Reluctant Dragon (1941) (effects animator) (uncredited)
 Baggage Buster (1941) (effects animator) (uncredited)
 A Gentleman's Gentleman (1941) (animator)
 The Little Whirlwind (1941) (effects animator) (uncredited)
 Pluto's Playmate (1941) (animator)
 Pantry Pirate (1940) (animator)
 Goofy's Glider (1940) (animator)
 Fantasia (1940) (effects animator) (segment "The Sorcerer's Apprentice") (uncredited)
 Put-Put Troubles (1940) (effects animator) (uncredited)
 Pinocchio (1940) (effects animator) (uncredited)
 Brave Little Tailor (1938) (effects animator) (uncredited)
 Snow White and the Seven Dwarfs (1937) (effects animator) (uncredited)

Animation Department:
 Bootle Beetle (1947) (animator)
 Clown of the Jungle (1947) (animator)
 Double Dribble (1946) (animator)
 Frank Duck Brings 'em Back Alive (1946) (animator)
 Canine Patrol (1945) (animator)
 Duck Pimples (1945) (animator)
 Californy'er Bust (1945) (animator)
 African Diary (1945) (animator)
 First Aiders (1944) (animator)
 Victory Vehicles (1943) (animator)
 Saludos Amigos (1942) (animator) (as Andrew Engman)
 Donald's Garden (1942) (effects animator)
 The New Spirit (1942) (animator) (uncredited)
 Der Fuehrer's Face (1943) (animator) (uncredited)

References

External links 

American animators
Swedish animators
Finnish animators
1911 births
2004 deaths
Walt Disney Animation Studios people
American people of Finnish descent